Upper Pohatcong Mountain is a ridge in the Appalachian Mountains of northwestern New Jersey in the United States. It is located in eastern Warren County, and extends northeast of Washington approximately 6 mi (10 km) to the vicinity of Hackettstown. The ridge has an average height of approximately 800 ft (240 m) and reaches a maximum summit of 1235 ft (374 m).

The ridge is the northeast continuation of Pohatcong Mountain south of Washington. The two ridges are sometimes called "Pohatcong Mountain" collectively.

External links
 New Jersey's highest named summits

Ridges of New Jersey
Landforms of Warren County, New Jersey